Gerald H. Kogan (May 23, 1933 – March 4, 2021) was a Justice of the Florida Supreme Court from January 30, 1987, to December 31, 1998. He served as chief justice from 1996 to 1998. He was born in New York City on May 23, 1933. He graduated from the University of Miami School of Law in 1955. He died on March 4, 2021.

References

Justices of the Florida Supreme Court
1933 births
2021 deaths
Constitution Project
Chief Justices of the Florida Supreme Court